Tunisia is a country in Northern Africa, bordering the Mediterranean Sea, having a western border with Algeria (965 km) and south-eastern border with Libya (459 km) where the width of land tapers to the south-west into the Sahara. The country has north, east and complex east-to-north coasts including the curved Gulf of Gabès, which forms the western part of Africa's Gulf of Sidra. Most of this greater gulf forms the main coast of Libya including the city of Sirte which shares its root name. Tunisia occupies an area of 163,610 square kilometres, of which 8,250 are water. The principal and reliable rivers rise in the north of the country with a few notable exceptions from north-east Algeria and flow through the northern plain where sufficient rainfall supports diverse plant cover and irrigated agriculture.

Maritime claims 

 Contiguous zone: 
 Territorial sea:

Physical geography 

Tunisia is on the Mediterranean coast of North Africa, midway between the Atlantic Ocean and the Nile Delta. It is bordered by Algeria on the west and Libya on the south east. It lies between latitudes 30° and 38°N, and longitudes 7° and 12°E. An abrupt southward turn of the Mediterranean coast in northern Tunisia gives the country two distinctive Mediterranean coasts, west–east in the north, and north–south in the east

Tunisia is about the size of the American state of Wisconsin. Despite its relatively small size, Tunisia has great environmental diversity due to its north–south extent. Its east–west extent is limited. Differences in Tunisia, like the rest of the Maghreb, are largely north–south environmental differences defined by sharply decreasing rainfall southward from any point.

The Dorsal, the eastern extension of the Saharan Atlas Mountains, runs across Tunisia in a northeasterly direction from the Algerian border in the west to the Cape Bon peninsula in the east. North of the Dorsal is the Tell, a region characterized by low, rolling hills and plains, again an extension of mountains to the west in Algeria. In the Khroumerie, the northwestern corner of the Tunisian Tell, elevations reach  and snow occurs in winter. The Sahel, a broadening coastal plain along Tunisia's eastern Mediterranean coast, is among the world's premier areas of olive cultivation. Inland from the Sahel, between the Dorsal and a range of hills south of Gafsa, are the steppes. Much of the southern region is desert.

Rivers 

The Medjerda River rises in Algeria and flows east through the third of the country with reliable rivers, the north. It empties into the Gulf of Tunis and Lake of Tunis. At  it is the longest river. It is also known as the wādi (or ) Majardah and Wadi Mejerha and it was known as Bagrada in ancient times. It rises in a further section of the Tell Atlas in Algeria, staying to the south of the Tell escarpment while within the country. It has been dammed at the Sidi Salem Dam.  The Oued Zouara rises in the country's own section of the Tell. It has been dammed by the Sidi el Barrak Dam which forms a large lake widely used across the north and centre of the country in an advanced water management project.

Climate 

Tunisia's climate is hot-summer Mediterranean climate (Köppen climate classification Csa) in the north, where winters are mild with moderate rainfall and summers are hot and dry. Temperatures in July and August can exceed  when the tropical continental air mass of the desert reaches the whole Tunisia. Winters are mild with temperatures rarely exceeding  (exception is the south-west of the country). The south of the country is desert. The terrain in the north is mountainous, which, moving south, gives way to a hot, dry central plain. As we go to the south, the climate naturally becomes hotter, drier and sunnier. The southern part has therefore a hot desert climate (Köppen climate classification BWh) with extremely hot summers, warm winters and very low annual rainfall amount. Daytime temperatures consistently turn around  during summers. However, the warmth of winters is only during daytime because nights can be cold in the desert. A series of salt lakes, known as chottzz or shatts, lie in an east–west line at the northern edge of the Sahara Desert, extending from the Gulf of Gabes into Algeria. Annual average rainfall amount is lower than  nearly everywhere in Tunisia. Tunisia is therefore a dry, semi-arid country. Areas with a pre-Saharan climate receive below  and areas with a typical Saharan climate receive below  of annual average precipitation.

Examples

Natural resources 

Tunisia possesses petroleum, phosphates, iron ore, lead, zinc, salt, gold and arable land. 3,850 km2 of land is irrigated in Tunisia. The use of land in the country is demonstrated in the following table.

Environment 

Current environmental issues for Tunisia include:

 Toxic and hazardous waste - disposal is ineffective and presents human health risks
 Water pollution from raw sewage
 Limited natural fresh water resources
 Deforestation
 Overgrazing
 Soil erosion
 Desertification

Tunisia is a party to the following international agreements: Biodiversity, Climate Change, Climate Change-Kyoto Protocol, Desertification, Endangered Species, Environmental Modification, Hazardous Wastes, Law of the Sea, Marine Dumping, Ozone Layer Protection, Ship Pollution (MARPOL 73/78) and Wetlands. Tunisia has signed, but not ratified the Marine Life Conservation agreement.

Tunisia, like other North African countries, has lost much of its prehistoric biodiversity due to the ongoing expanding human population; for example, until historic times there was a population of the endangered primate Barbary macaque (Macaca sylvanus). The monk seal is now extirpated (locally extinct).

Extreme points 

This is a list of the extreme points of Tunisia, the points that are farther north, south, east or west than any other

 Northernmost point - Gallo, Iles des Chiens, Galite Islands, Bizerte Governorate
 Northernmost point (mainland) –  Ras ben Sakka (Ra's al Abyad), Bizerte Governorate*
 Easternmost point – Bel Ahemer on the border with Libya, Medenine Governorate
 Southernmost point – the tripoint with Algeria and Libya, Tataouine Governorate
 Westernmost point -  Village of Hizwa on the border with Algeria due west of Nefta, Tozeur Governorate
 *Note: this is also the northernmost point of the African continent

See also 
 List of cities in Tunisia

Notes

References 

 Some material in this article is adapted from the CIA World Factbook 2008.